John William Armstrong (born 25 June 1987) is a Scottish professional footballer who plays for Edinburgh United.

Career
Armstrong was selected for the Lothian Schools XI in 2002 while a pupil at Beeslack High School (Penicuik), along with other Hearts youngsters Jason Thomson, David Gray and Andrew Driver. He joined Hearts from their youth system and tasted his first involvement of senior action when he was named as an unused substitute in their Scottish Premier League match against Dunfermline Athletic on 2 January 2007. He made his debut as a substitute at the same venue on 3 February 2007, as Dunfermline beat Hearts 1–0 in the Scottish Cup.

He joined Cowdenbeath on a season-long loan in July 2007, and was again loaned to Cowdenbeath in the 2008–09 season. On 13 October 2009 the defender left Hearts to return to Cowdenbeath, signing a two-year deal with the side. After six years with the club, Cowdenbeath agreed to terminate Armstrong's contract in November 2015 to enable him to pursue other career opportunities. Shortly after leaving Cowdenbeath, Armstrong signed for Scottish Junior side Edinburgh United.

References

External links
 Profile at londonhearts.com
 
 

1987 births
Living people
Footballers from Edinburgh
Scottish footballers
Heart of Midlothian F.C. players
Cowdenbeath F.C. players
Scottish Football League players
Association football defenders
Scottish Professional Football League players
Edinburgh United F.C. players
Scottish Junior Football Association players